Edeltraud Schramm (16 December 1923 – 1 October 2002) was an Austrian gymnast. She competed at the 1948 Summer Olympics and the 1952 Summer Olympics.

References

1923 births
2002 deaths
Austrian female artistic gymnasts
Olympic gymnasts of Austria
Gymnasts at the 1948 Summer Olympics
Gymnasts at the 1952 Summer Olympics
Sportspeople from Linz
20th-century Austrian women